The Hacettepe Symphony Orchestra (Hacettepe Senfoni Orkestrası) is an orchestra based in Ankara, Turkey. It was founded in 2003 and is currently conducted by Erol Erdinç.

Turkish symphony orchestras
Culture in Ankara
Musical groups established in 2003
University orchestras